Virahanka (Devanagari: विरहाङ्क) was an Indian prosodist who is also known for his work on mathematics.  He may have lived in the 6th century, but it is also possible that he worked as late as the 8th century.

His work on prosody builds on the Chhanda-sutras of Pingala (4th century BCE), and was the basis for a 12th-century commentary by Gopala.
He was the first to propose the so-called Fibonacci Sequence.

See also
Indian mathematicians

External links
 The So-called Fibonacci Numbers in Ancient and Medieval India  by Parmanand Singh

8th-century Indian mathematicians
Fibonacci numbers
Medieval Sanskrit grammarians
Ancient Indian mathematical works